The Thailand women's national football team has represented Thailand at the FIFA Women's World Cup at two stagings of the tournament; they have appeared in the last two tournaments, held in 2015 and 2019.

FIFA Women's World Cup record

Record by opponent

2015 FIFA Women's World Cup

Group B

2019 FIFA Women's World Cup

Group F

Goalscorers

References

 
Countries at the FIFA Women's World Cup